Spanagonicus albofasciatus, the whitemarked fleahopper, is a species of plant bug in the family Miridae. It is found in the Caribbean Sea, Central America, North America, and Oceania.

References

Further reading

 

Phylinae
Articles created by Qbugbot
Insects described in 1907